Monte Buey is a town located in the Marcos Juárez Department of Córdoba Province, Argentina.

History

The settlement was established in 1909 when the General Bartolomé Mitre railway built a railway station named Monte de Buey. In 1910 it was recorded that the only building in the locality was the railway station.

The settlement has gradually expanded, having a population of 6,285 in 2010.

External links
  Monte Buey municipal website

Populated places in Córdoba Province, Argentina
Populated places established in 1909
1909 establishments in Argentina